MG, Mg, or mg and variants may refer to:

Organizations
 MG Cars, an automotive marque of the now defunct MG Car Company
 MG Motor, a present-day car manufacturing company
MG JW Automobile, a Pakistani automobile manufacturer
 Champion Air (IATA code)
 Matematička gimnazija, a school in Belgrade
 Monte Generoso railway

Arts and entertainment
 MG, a character in The Perhapanauts comics
 Match Game, a television game show
 Magilla Gorilla, a cartoon character

Music
 Main gauche, "left hand" in piano playing
 MG (Martin Gore album)
 The M.G.'s, from the band Booker T. & the M.G.'s
 The MG's (album), an album by the M.G.'s
 MG Select, a house duo music production including George Jackson
 M:G, real name Maribel Gonzalez, dance music singer

Military
 Machine gun (MG-), prefix for model designations, for example, "MG42"
 Major general, a military rank
 Medal for Gallantry, a military decoration

Places
 Madagascar (ISO 3166-1 country code MG)
 .mg, the Internet country code top-level domain for Madagascar
 Minas Gerais, Brazil
 Mongolia (FIPS 10-4 country code MG)

Science and technology
 .mg, the Internet country code top-level domain for Madagascar
 mg (text editor), a text editing program
 Magnesium, a chemical element with symbol Mg
 Motor-generator, a device for converting electrical power to another form
 Manual Gates, a type of level crossing used in the United Kingdom
 Microgrid, a local architecture for power grid within the concept of Smart Grid that can function both connected to and isolanded from the main grid.
 Force of gravity, product of mass (m) by acceleration of gravity (g)
 MagicGate and OpenMG, encryption technologies of Sony

Biology and medicine
 Michaelis-Gutmann bodies, concentrically layered basophilic inclusions in the urinary tract
 Monoglyceride, or monoacylglycerol
 Myasthenia gravis, a neuromuscular disease
 Mycoplasma gallisepticum, a disease affecting chickens and other birds
 Mycoplasma genitalium, a sexually transmitted bacterium

Units of measurement
 Milligram (mg), equal to 10−3 grams
 Megagram (Mg), equal to 106 grams
 Milligauss (mG), equal to 1.0 × 10−7 teslas 
 Megagauss (MG), equal to 100 teslas

Other uses
 Mg (magazine), an American business monthly
 Malagasy language
 Outlaw motorcycle club (motorcycle gang)
 Matt Groening

See also

 
 GM (disambiguation)
 UG (disambiguation) for some uses of μG/ΜG (MU-G)
 ΜG (Mu-G), microgravity
 Μg (mu-G), microgram